Radio 538 is a Dutch commercial radio station that was founded in Hilversum, Netherlands in 1992. It is the second-most listened to radio station in the Netherlands. Radio 538 refers to the wavelength on which Radio Veronica used to broadcast in the 1970s. The station is owned by Talpa Network. Mostly targetting a young audience, the station plays a mix of current dance, R&B, pop, and rock hits. The music selection is mainly based on the Dutch Top 40 chart. Its breakfast and drive-time shows are talk-intensive. 

The station was originally only accessible through cable. In 1998, Radio 538 upgraded their frequency package, allowing for different frequencies by region. Radio 538 launched the hip-hop and contemporary R&B program Juize, which developed into the radio station Juize FM in 2004. In 2011, Radio 538 created a sister television station called TV 538.

History

Radio 538 was founded in 1992 and is the successor of Sky Hitradio, a sister station of Sky Radio that broadcast from July to 11 December 1992 and an initiative of a group of former Radio Veronica employees, led by Lex Harding. Transmissions began on 11 December 1992 from a villa in Bussum. The name Radio 538 is a reference to the wavelength (538m:558 kHz) on which Radio Veronica was broadcast in the seventies. Presenters of the first hour were Rick van Velthuysen, Wessel van Diepen, Erik de Zwart, Michael Pilarczyk, Will Luikinga and Corné Klijn.

The broadcasts of Radio 538 were initially made in Studio Concordia in Bussum, a building that was already being used as a television studio and was used in the eighties and nineties by Veronica program Countdown. In the late nineties Radio 538 moved from Bussum to Hilversum, where it moved into a studio complex close to the town hall. Since December 1, 2012, houses the entire 538 Group in the 4400 m2 NCRV building at Bergweg 70 in Hilversum.

Initially, from its start in 1992 until 1995, Radio 538 was only available via cable. A request to be allowed to broadcast over the air was rejected at that time. Following a media campaign during which 320,000 signatures were collected and Radio 538 acquired its over-the-air frequency in 1995 – or more precisely, a collection of several regional frequencies. In 2003, Radio 538 was granted a new nationwide frequency, 102 MHz (FM). 538 had to pay €57 million for the new frequencies.

In 1995, Lex Harding started TMF (The Music Factory), a TV station, and Erik de Zwart became the new chairman of 538. At the end of 2002 Erik de Zwart left to go to competitor Noordzee FM. Jan-Willem Brüggenwirth became the new chairman. In December 2003 Radio 538 was sold to Advent International, Lex Harding retaining 10% of the shares. In May 2005 Radio 538 was sold in its entirety to Talpa Holding, owned by Dutch media mogul John de Mol. In June 2007 De Mol sold the TV and radio assets of Talpa to RTL Nederland and became shareholder of RTL Nederland.

Radio 538 managed in 10 years to win a substantial market share. In April/May 2004, the station nudged market leader Sky Radio to the throne. Nowadays 538 still competes with NPO Radio 2 and NPO 3FM as the most listened radio station in the Netherlands. The marketing share is between 10 and 12 percent. In 2002, 2004 and 2009 Radio 538 won the Marconi Award for best radio station.

In Flanders, a Flemish version of Radio 538 launched on cable in February 1999, pending the airwave frequency allocation for national commercial radio, which in the late nineties was announced by the Flemish government in 2000. When in 2000 was no clear procedure for a given frequency, Radio 538 withdrew from Flanders.

In 2011 Talpa worked together with Finnish media conglomerate Sanoma to buy the Dutch activities of SBS Broadcasting from German broadcaster ProSiebenSat.1 Media. As part of that deal De Mol sold his shares in RTL Nederland to the RTL Group, retaining the ownership of Radio 538 and its sister station SLAM!FM. In 2014 Radio 538 started with some new programs. De Avondploeg, De Show Zonder Naam and Jurk!FM.

In 2018, the station announced that it would stop carrying the flagship Dutch Top 40 chart. Prior to this, it has been discontinued on FM signal for quite some time. The replacement will be named 538TOP50, and it is compiled based on the selection from 150,000 538Members, airplay on Spotify, YouTube and all the Dutch music stations, alongside Talpa's app JUKE. Dutch Top 40 is now on Qmusic.

Format
In the beginning, the station focused mainly on youth with slogans like, "The station of a young generation". With the advent of disc jockeys such as Edwin Evers, the target group expanded, and the station became wider. A new Alarmschijf and Dancesmash still ran weekly. The listener can also help decide which music is played in the program Maak 't or kraak 't and in past the Top 538. Jingles for the station is recorded by Wessel van Diepen, Rick Romijn and Kimberly van de Berkt.

Nowadays, the station makes commercial hit radio for young people in the broadest sense of the word. The format consists of Top 40 music, dance, Contemporary R&B and "throwbacks", supplemented with information and entertainment by DJs. The morning shows (4am-12pm) feature a mix of current and classic hits. The afternoon and nighttime shows focus more on current hits.

Frequencies
From the launch in 1992 and until 1994, Radio 538 was distributed via cable. In 1994 the station submitted a request for an FM license, however larger stations (such as Radio 538 and SkyRadio) were not granted any FM licenses at that time in favour of smaller, local radio stations. Subsequently, Radio 538 started a media campaign, where a total of 320,000 signatures were collected and in 1995 Radio 538 received license to broadcast on FM on the frequency (103.0 MHz, from Lelystad). On January 1, 1998, the station moved to another frequency package, with different frequencies in different regions.

At the air distribution in 2003 (called Zerobase) Radio 538 received a new nationwide FM network. Radio 538 has since been received in large parts of the Netherlands over the air on the FM band via the following frequencies: 102.1/102.3 MHz North Holland, Groningen 102.2 MHz, 102.3 MHz North Brabant, Gelderland, Limburg, 102.4 MHz Zeeland and North Brabant, Friesland and Utrecht 102.5 MHz, 102.6 MHz Overijssel and Gelderland, 102.7 MHz South Holland and Drenthe. Radio 538 promotes its frequencies as "102 FM". Due to the lack of available FM frequencies in the south Limburg region, it was also rebroadcast on 891 kHz mediumwave from a transmitter in Hulsberg.

Radio 538 can also be received via Digitenne and the whole of Europe via satellite and worldwide via the Internet. Previously it was available on mobile phones via UMTS (on the portals of KPN i-mode and Vodafone Live) and in Limburg on AM 891 kHz, 336 m. 

Radio 538 also transmits a TMC signal from traffic for route navigation.

From Tuesday, August 30, 2011 until November 23, 2011 Radio 538 was broadcast on 106.0 MHz from the tower of Ping FM in the Belgian Lanaken, for the region of Limburg-Maastricht from 12am at night until 7 pm. Ping FM was eventually ordered by the Vlaamse Regulator voor de Media (Flemish Regulator for the Media) to stop the retransmission of programs of Radio 538. In mid-September 2014 the programs of 538 can be heard via Ping FM. During the day on weekdays, on Thursday, till Sunday also few hours in the evening and on Saturday and Sunday mornings.

In August 2016, it was reported that Radio 538 would cease to broadcast via mediumwave 891 kHz within one month, as it is now well-received via cable, DAB+ and the internet in the south Limburg region. From 26 October 2016 this transmitting is indeed ceased.

Programs

The two most important pillars of the weekday programming are the morning show De 538 Morning Show with Frank Dane (06.00-10.00), which can be heard on the channel from January 2019 (from April 2000 to December 2018 Edwin Evers presented the program Evers Staat Op) and the afternoon show De Coen en Sander Show with Coen Swijnenberg and Sander Lantinga (16.00-19.00). Between 10:00 and 16:00 Barend van Deelen, Niek van der Bruggen and Ivo van Breukelen will each present a two-hour program. In the evening Lindo Duvall (19.00-22.00) and Igmar Felicia (22.00-00.00) can be heard. At night there is the 53N8 Non-Stop, which only plays music. Danny Blom can be heard from 04.00 to 06.00.

On Friday afternoon there is different programming with the 538 Top 50 (previously the Dutch Top 40) with Mark Labrand (14.00-18.00). The Friday evening programming consists of Weekend Wietze with Wietze de Jager (18.00-21.00), 538 weekend mix (21.00-22.00) and Mart Meijer (22.00-00.00).

On Saturday during the day, the programming consists of: The best of 538 (6.00-10.00), Mart Meijer (10.00-13.00), Mark Labrand (13.00-16.00) and Weekend Wietze with Wietze de Jager (16.00-19.00). On Saturday evening the programming consists of: Global Dance Chart (19.00-21.00), Dance Department with Ivo van Breukelen (21.00-23.00), Martin Garrix (23.00-00.00), Lucas & Steve (00.00-01.00), Tiësto (01.00-2.00) and finally David Guetta (02.00-03.00). This is followed by two Non-stop programs. On Sunday during the day, Bas Menting (06:00-10:00), Mart Meijer (10:00-13:00) and Mark Labrand (13.00-16:00) present the 53N8 Top 50 Non-stop (16:00-19:00) one after the other. On Sunday evening you can listen to Jaimy de Ruijter (19.00-22.00) and Igmar Felicia (22.00-00.00).

News
Every hour also on the half-hour, the news is broadcast, which is provided by the Algemeen Nederlands Persbureau (ANP). The regular newsreaders on Radio 538 are:

 Roelof Hemmen
 Jo van Egmond
 Mart Grol

At other times the news is read by newscasters associated with the ANP.

Spinoffs
In 1999, Radio 538 started the hip-hop and contemporary R&B program Juize, which developed into the radio station Juize.FM on 18 July 2004. Since 1 July 2005, Juize FM is broadcast in most of the Netherlands by cable and has also started running shows with presenters.

Current DJs

Former DJs

Events

Queen's/King's day
Until 2011 538 organized annually at Queen's Day a big party on the Museumplein in Amsterdam. Several artists from home and abroad joined there by from 12pm and the day was traditionally ended with a grand musical and visual spectacle of a well-known DJs. At this event, some 300,000 visitors came off. In November 2011 the city of Amsterdam decided that this Queen's Day Party was not allowed to take place in connection with safety. Initially, the 538-party in 2012 at the square near RAI Amsterdam will be held, but in January of that year it was decided to call off the whole party. After an evaluation of the edition 2012 the city council decided in 2013 to pursue the creation of more scattered, smaller celebrations on Queen's Day. Since King's Day 2014 the big party finds annual place again, but at a different location; in Breda on the Chasséveld.

538 Schoolawards

All secondary schools in the Netherlands were able to register for this election, after which the students could vote for their school. The schools with the most votes went together into battle in the final to win a big school and the 538 Schoolawards title. In 2006 the Zwijsen College in Veghel won. In 2007 the prize was won by Adelbert College in Wassenaar, in 2008 by CSG Willem van Oranje in Oud-Beijerland, in 2009 by the Baudartius College in Zutphen, in 2010 by Het Baarnsch Lyceum in Baarn, in 2011 by Sg Spieringshoek in Schiedam and in 2012 by Kalsbeek College in Woerden. From 2013 SLAM!FM took the School Awards over from 538.

Turn up the Beach
On July 9, 2011 538 organized in collaboration with Spa Reine the beach festival Turn up the Beach. This first edition on the beach of IJmuiden was a great success. All 10,000 tickets were sold. On July 14, 2012, 538 organized in collaboration with Pepsi the second edition of Turn up the Beach. On July 13, 2013 was the third edition of Turn up the beach.

538 JingleBall
On December 22, 2012 Radio 538 and RTL 5 organized the price show and music festival 538 JingleBall in the Ziggo Dome. This first edition was a great success. This show was organized because Radio 538 existed 20 years in 2012. On December 21, 2013 was the second edition of 538 JingleBall, this time there was only dance music ran by Dutch DJ's. Even before the second edition was held Radio 538 had announced that there would be a third edition of 538 JingleBall. It was held on December 19 and December 20, 2014.

538 Oranjeplein
If the Netherlands is joining a UEFA European Championship or FIFA World Cup, Radio 538 organizes the 538 Oranjeplein on the Museumplein in Amsterdam. People can watch all matches of the Dutch national team jointly on large screens at the Museumplein. During the 2014 World Cup the Oranjeplein was however after the eighth finals no longer held since the times of the matches that followed because of the time difference with Brazil were too late and the inconvenience was too large for local residents. During the semi-finals, however, it organized an Oranjeplein again, but in a different location, the Arena Park, next to the Amsterdam Arena.

The Voice of Holland
Radio 538 broadcasts during The Voice of Holland together with RTL 4 the live shows of the talent.

Actions

Hier met je rekening!
An annual item Hier met je rekening! (English: Here is your bill!). With this action 538 pays the accounts of listeners. To join it, the listener must send an email with a copy of the bill plus the description and amount of the bill. The account can also be uploaded on the website of Radio 538 using a special form which is for and during the action to find on this site. The entries will be once per hour a name called. The person who is involved should then call to the studio within fifteen minutes, then his or her account is paid (Radio 538 then makes the total amount of the account to the account of the listener so that it can pay on account of this). From 2014 538 also pays bills via Twitter. On the Twitter page of Radio 538 during the action a submitted bill appears and the one who recognizes this bill must then retweet within fifteen minutes, after which the bill will be paid. This action takes place twice a year, in January, after the Christmas holidays and in August/September, after the summer holidays, because people in these two holidays to spend much money on groceries for Christmas dinner (in the holidays) or souvenirs and trips during the holidays (in the Summer) and then often left with little money to pay for other often high bills that often lie thereby. Radio 538 assists over here to pay them a hand by these accounts.

53J8
Here there is a secret person, better known as Mr. X that passes through the land.

Every day, he is at a different location. On which location the listener gets little tips on the radio. The listener who finds on this basis Mr. X, receives 50 000, - euro note. If he was somewhere he sticks a sticker to and tells at the end of the day where he has been.

538 voor War Child
538 voor War Child was an action that took place from March 25 to April 1, 2011, from March 9 to March 16, 2012 and from March 22 to March 29, 2013.

During the action the money was collected for War Child, an organization designed to help children cope with their war trauma. Listeners of the radio station came up with the stunts that were done during the week of action, and that money was raised. Every day was 538 with a mobile studio on a different place in the Netherlands.

The places where 538 in 2012 was a guest was: Maastricht, 's-Hertogenbosch, Nijmegen, Hilversum, Alphen aan den Rijn, Meppel, Leeuwarden and Groningen. Performances were given by, among other Pearl Jozefzoon, Glennis Grace, Hardwell, Ben Saunders, Iris Kroes, VanVelzen, Ferry Corsten, Destine, Waylon, Di-rect, Charly Luske, Racoon, Lange Frans and Xander de Buisonjé.

In 2013, 538 was a guest in: Groningen, Heerenveen, Alkmaar, Gouda, Bergen op Zoom, Veenendaal, Arnhem and 's-Hertogenbosch.

On May 1, 2013 it was announced that 538 stops 538 for War Child.

Win met de zin
Win met de zin (English: Win with the sentence) is a game that was first played on August 25, 2014. From this year, this game is played twice a year, in February and August. In this game listeners are required to guess the names of four celebrity voices. Each will say a part of the sentence "The Beat / Of The Moment / Radio / 538" (in 2017 "Eén station / Alle hits / Radio / 538" and from 2018 "Win Met De Zin / = 538 / Radio / = 538"). The starting price is €1000 and for each failed attempt €100 was added to the prize fund. The jackpot is won by the listener who does well all four votes. Then start a new round. The game is played every hour between 7:00 and 19:00.

Owners
Radio 538 was founded in 1992 by Lex Harding. In 1995 Lex Harding founded the TV channel TMF (The Music Factory). Both stations aired from the same building and worked together a lot. Erik de Zwart became the new director of Radio 538. In late 2002 Erik de Zwart moved to Talpa Radio International.

In December 2003, Radio 538 was sold to the investment fund Advent International. Lex Harding retained 10% of the shares.

On May 23, 2005 Radio 538 was fully acquired by Talpa by John de Mol and Lex Harding took definitely goodbye. Together with Radio 10 Gold, which already owned by Talpa, Radio 538 was brought under the management of Talpa Radio (since 2006: Talpa Media). Until that moment, Talpa, next to Radio 10 Gold, also owned Noordzee FM. Because it was not allowed under the provisions of the 2003 frequency to two general, possess national commercial radio broadcasters, Talpa was forced to sell Noordzee FM. The Flemish company De Persgroep took Noordzee FM and renamed the station few months later to Q-music. De Persgroep does not have to pay anything for Noordzee FM to Talpa.

On October 1, 2007 Radio 538, along with various programs from the television channel Tien was taken over by RTL Nederland. On January 1, 2012 Radio 538 was, like its sister stations Radio 10 Gold and Slam!FM, taken over again by Talpa Holding. This was a result of a transaction between RTL Group and Talpa Holding, which has been an exchange of shares and sale to the order. RTL Group owned back all shares in RTL Nederland Holding since January 1, 2015, while Talpa became again the 100% owner of Radio 538. All this is a result of participation by Talpa Holding in SBS Broadcasting.

Sister stations

TV 538 is a television channel which started in 2011 as a TV channel of Radio 538. In addition, the station has a number of digital channels that link to Radio 538, like 53L8, 538NL and 538IBIZA.

See also
 List of radio stations in the Netherlands

References

External links

Radio 538 business website
Radio 538 Fanclub

Radio stations in the Netherlands
Radio stations established in 1992
1992 establishments in the Netherlands
Adult top 40 radio stations
Mass media in Hilversum
Music in Hilversum
Talpa Network